The Woodville Karst Plain is a  karst area that runs from Tallahassee, Florida, U.S. to the Gulf of Mexico separated by the Cody Scarp.

This karst plain includes numerous first magnitude springs, including Wakulla-Leon Sinks Cave System, the longest surveyed underwater cave in the United States extending  and ranking #57 among the top 100 longest caves in the world. The WKP is home to five of the 27 reported species of troglobites in Florida and South Georgia including Woodville Karst cave crayfish and Swimming Florida cave isopod. Also of interest are the Leon Sinks.

Wakulla-Leon Sinks Cave System

Wakulla cave consists of a dendritic network of conduits of which  have been surveyed and mapped. The conduits are characterized as long tubes with diameter and depth being consistent ( depth); however, joining tubes can be divided by larger chambers of varying geometries. Four secondary conduits, including Leon Sinks intersect the main conduit. Most of these secondary conduits have been fully explored.

On Dec 15, 2007, the connection between the Wakulla cave system and Leon Sinks cave system was made by members of the Woodville Karst Plain Project to establish the Wakulla-Leon Sinks Cave System.

References

External links
Longest caves in Florida
Long Underwater Caves @ CaveSurvey.com
Map of the Woodville Karst Plain from Northwest Florida Water Management District

Landforms of Florida
Geography of Florida